Ingolfiella longipes is a species of amphipod crustacean in the family Ingolfiellidae. It is known from a single specimen held at the Naturalis Biodiversity Center. It was collected from Walsingham Sink Cave, an anchialine cave in Hamilton Parish, Bermuda, and is thus considered to be critically endangered.

References

Ingolfiellidea
Endemic fauna of Bermuda
Crustaceans of the Atlantic Ocean
Cave crustaceans
Hamilton Parish
Taxonomy articles created by Polbot
Crustaceans described in 1987
Species known from a single specimen